Harpalus was an ancient Greek astronomer (flourished during the 82nd Olympiad, c. 450 BC) who corrected the cycle of Cleostratus and invented the Nine Year Cycle.

He may also have been the engineer Harpalus, who designed a pontoon bridge solution when Xerxes wished his army to cross the Hellespont.

The lunar crater Harpalus is named for him.

References
 Historical, genealogical, and classical dictionary By Historical, genealogical and classical dictionary Harpalus (1743)
 The Origin of the History of Science in Classical Antiquity (Peripatoi 19) (Hardcover) by Leonid Zhmud page 270  (2006)
 Handbuch der Altertumswissenschaft: calendars and years in classical antiquity By Walter Otto, Iwan von Müller, Hermann Bengtson, Alan E. Samuel Page 39  (1972)

Footnotes

Ancient Greek astronomers
5th-century BC Greek people